Thays Énmyna Férrer Amorim (born 31 October 1999) is a Brazilian  professional footballer who plays as a forward. She last played in the Turkish Women's Super League for ALG Spor.

Early life
She became a footballer after facing prejudice at home.

Career

Brazil
Thays Ferrer started football playing as an amateur in her hometown. She then moved to Juazeiro do Norte, and became a professional.

She played in her country for Viana MA (2016), Abelhas Rainhas (2017), Lusaca-BA (2018), Tiradentes  (2018/2019) and Foz Cataratas/Athletico Paranaense  (2019). In 2016, her team won the State Championship Campeonato Maranhense. Her team became champion of the Campeonato Paulista de Futebol Feminino in 2018.

Foreign countries
In August 2019, she went to Portugal, and signed a 10-month contract with Paio Pires FC  to play in the 2019–20 A.F. Setúbal II Divisão. The next season, she transferred to Atlético Ouriense (2020–21), who compete in the Campeonato Nacional Feminino.

In 2021, she was in South Korea for Hwacheon KSPO WFC in the WK League. Her team finished the season in fourth place.

On 22 February 2022, Ferrer moved to Turkey, and signed a one-year contract with the Gaziantep-based Women's Super League club ALG Spor. She scored five goals in 17 matches in the second half of the 2021–22 Women's Super League season. She enjoyed the league champion title with her team after play-offs.

On 25 August 2022, Ferrer signed with the Japanese Regional Chūgoku Soccer League club Diosa Izumo FC.

Honours
 Campeonato Maranhense (Brazil)
 Viana MA
 Winners (1): 2016.

 Campeonato Paulista de Futebol Feminino (Brazil)
  Lusaca-BA
 Winners (1): 2018.

 Women's Super League (Turkey)
 ALG Spor
 Winners (1): 2021–22.

References

1999 births
Living people
People from Ceará
Brazilian women's footballers
Women's association football forwards
Brazilian expatriate sportspeople in Portugal
Expatriate women's footballers in Portugal
Atlético Ouriense players
Brazilian expatriate sportspeople in South Korea
Expatriate women's footballers in South Korea
Brazilian expatriate sportspeople in Turkey
Expatriate women's footballers in Turkey
Turkish Women's Football Super League players
ALG Spor players